Underground: The Julian Assange Story is an Australian television film produced for Network Ten. It premiered at the 2012 Toronto International Film Festival and aired on Network Ten on 7 October 2012. The film draws its title from Underground: Tales of Hacking, Madness and Obsession on the Electronic Frontier, a 1997 book by Suelette Dreyfus, researched by Julian Assange, but the film bears little relation to the book itself, which catalogues the exploits of a group of Australian, American, and British hackers during the 1980s and early 1990s, among them Assange himself. The film was not approved by Julian Assange, Wikileaks or any other member of the Assange family and there was no collaboration with the Assanges or Wikileaks during the making of the film. However Julian Assange subsequently had "a very favourable response to the movie".

Filmed in and around Melbourne, the film was written and directed by Robert Connolly and produced by Matchbox Pictures' Helen Bowden, with Tony Ayres and Rick Maier serving as Executive Producers.

Synopsis 
In 1989, known as 'Mendax', Assange and two friends formed a group called the 'International Subversives'. Using early home computers and defining themselves as 'white hat hackers' – those who look but don't steal – they broke into some of the world's most powerful and secretive organisations. They were young, brilliant, and in the eyes of the US Government, a major threat to national security.

At the urging of the FBI, the Australian Federal Police set up a special taskforce to catch them. But at a time when most Australian police had never seen a computer, let alone used one, they had to figure out just where to begin.

Police ingenuity and old-fashioned detective work are pitted against nimble, highly skilled young men in this new crime frontier. What follows is a game of cat and mouse through the electronic underground of Melbourne.

Cast 
 Rachel Griffiths – Christine Assange  
 Anthony LaPaglia – Detective Ken Roberts  
 Alex Williams – Julian Assange
 Laura Wheelwright – Electra 
 Callan McAuliffe – Prime Suspect 
 Jordan Raskopoulos – Trax 
 Benedict Samuel – Jonah

Broadcast and reception 
1.34 million viewers watched the Australian television premiere on 7 October 2012. It was also the top trending topic in Australia on Twitter during the broadcast.

Critical reception
The film received mixed reviews from critics. Ahead of the premiere at the 2012 Toronto International Film Festival, Daniel Janvier of Toronto Film Scene wrote "This film is deeply frustrating watch. It takes the approach of many biopics – cramming in as much information as possible ... If this were a televised miniseries, with multiple installments to cover everything it wants to perhaps it would be better served."

Australian critics were more positive. David Knox of TV Tonight described it as "a terrific yarn that elevates Assange as a journalistic warrior, and Alex Williams as a new star". Karl Quinn writing in The Age concluded the film was "A considered yet gripping look at the crucible in which Julian Assange was formed and, arguably, deformed. Brilliant."

The telefeature has received two nominations at the 2nd AACTA Awards (Australian Academy of Cinema and Television Arts), including Best Telefeature, Mini Series or Short Run Series and Best Guest or Supporting Actress in a Television Drama for Laura Wheelwright.

Other reactions
Julian Assange himself was reported to have had "a very favourable response to the movie" and "particularly likes the actor who plays him".

Christine Assange, Julian Assange's mother, wrote "I was relieved and very happy to see how accurately Julian was portrayed" and "Alex Williams was so convincing at times I actually felt I was looking at my son" but "I did cringe at times while viewing the portrayal of my own character".

Former head of the Australian Federal Police computer crime unit Ken Dey criticised the film as "a work of fiction masquerading as fact", in particular the portrayed infiltration of MILNET which they claimed never happened.

See also
 The Fifth Estate — 2013 DreamWorks film starring Benedict Cumberbatch

References

External links

 (rating 3/5)

Network 10 original programming
2010s Australian television miniseries
2012 television films
2012 films
Cultural depictions of Julian Assange
Films about activists
Television series by Matchbox Pictures
Works about computer hacking
Films directed by Robert Connolly